Bollenti spiriti is a 1981 Italian fantasy-comedy film directed by Giorgio Capitani.

Cast 
 Johnny Dorelli as Giovanni Guiscardo
 Gloria Guida as Marta
 Lia Tanzi as Nicole
 Alessandro Haber as Vittorio
 Lory Del Santo as Lilli
 Francesca Romana Coluzzi as Benzinaia
 Adriana Russo as the maid

Release
Bollenti spiriti was distributed theatrically by D.L.F. on 30 December 1981.

See also
 List of Italian films of 1981

References

Footnotes

Sources

External links

1981 films
Italian fantasy comedy films
1980s fantasy comedy films
Films directed by Giorgio Capitani
Films scored by Piero Umiliani
Italian ghost films
1980s ghost films
1981 comedy films
1980s Italian films